The Ice Saints are St. Mamertus (or, in some countries, St. Boniface of Tarsus), St. Pancras, and St. Servatius. They are so named because their feast days fall on the days of May 11, May 12, and May 13 respectively, known as the blackthorn winter in Austrian, Belgian, Croatian, Czech, Dutch, French, German, Hungarian, North-Italian, Polish, Slovak, Slovene and Swiss folklore.

Folklore
In parts of the Northern Hemisphere, the period from May 12 to May 15 is often believed to bring a brief spell of colder weather in many years, including the last nightly frosts of the spring. Pupils of Galileo confirmed this weather pattern for the years 1655-70 and reported a marked cold snap over the days of the Ice Saints. However, in 1902 William Dines, President of the Royal Meteorological Society, used modern statistical techniques to demonstrate that the Ice Saints were a myth, brought about by selective reporting. On the other hand, a review of Kew Gardens data from 1941 to 1969 showed that 13 May was usually the warmest day of the month, and was followed by a sharp drop in temperature.

In 1582, the replacement of the Julian calendar by the Gregorian calendar involved omitting 10 days in the calendar. So if the folklore predates the calendar change, then the equivalent dates from the climatic point of view would be May 22–25.

St. Mamertus is not counted amongst the Ice Saints in certain countries (Southern Germany, Austria, Northern Italy, Czech Republic, etc.), whereas St. Boniface of Tarsus belongs to them in other countries (Flanders, Liguria, Czech Republic, etc.) as well; St. Boniface's feast day falling on May 14. St. Sophia, nicknamed Cold Sophia (German kalte Sophie) on May 15 can be added in Germany, Alsace (France), Poland, etc.

In Poland, the Czech Republic and Slovakia, the Ice Saints are St. Pancras, St. Servatus and St. Boniface of Tarsus (i.e., May 12 to May 14). To the Poles, the trio are known collectively as zimni ogrodnicy (cold gardeners) and are followed by zimna Zośka (cold Sophia) on the feast day of St. Sophia, which falls on May 15. In Czech, the three saints are collectively referred to as "ledoví muži" (ice men or icy men) and St. Sophia is known as "Žofie, ledová žena" (Sophia, the ice woman).

In Sweden, the German legend of the Ice Saints has resulted in the belief that there are special "järnnätter" (Swedish for "iron nights") especially in early June, which are susceptible to frost. The term may have arisen out of a mistranslation of German sources, where the term "Eismänner" (German for "ice men") was read as "Eisenmänner" (German for "iron men") and their nights then termed "iron nights," which then became shifted from May to June.

See also
Seven Sleepers Day
Weather saints

References

Further reading
 Brewer, E. Cobham. "Ice Saints or Frost Saints", Dictionary of Phrase and Fable, 1898

Christian saints in unknown century
Groups of Roman Catholic saints
Weather lore
Year of birth unknown